Chinchilla rats or chinchillones are members of the family Abrocomidae. This family has few members compared to most rodent families, with only nine known living species. They resemble chinchillas in appearance, with a similar soft fur and silvery-grey color, but have a body structure more like a short-tailed rat. They are social, tunnel-dwelling animals, and live in the Andes Mountains of South America. They are probably herbivorous, although this is not clear.

They can be described as medium-sized.  Stiff hairs project over the three middle digits of the rear feet. Their massive skulls narrow in the facial areas. Some molecular work suggests that, despite their appearance, they may be more closely related to octodontoids such as degus, nutria, and tuco-tucos than they are to chinchillas and viscachas.

Etymology
The family name is derived from the Ancient Greek word ἁβροκόμης (habrokomēs, "with delicate hair"). The word ἁβρός (habros) means "delicate, graceful" and the word κόμη (komē) means "hair".

Species
Family Abrocomidae - chinchilla rats
†Protabrocoma
†Protabrocoma antigua
Abrocoma
A. bennettii - Bennett's chinchilla rat
A. boliviensis - Bolivian chinchilla rat
A. budini - Budin's chinchilla rat
A. cinerea - ashy chinchilla rat
A. famatina - Famatina chinchilla rat
A. schistacea - Sierra del Tontal chinchilla rat
A. uspallata - Uspallata chinchilla rat
A. vaccarum - Punta de Vacas chinchilla rat or Mendozan chinchilla rat
Cuscomys
C. ashaninka - Asháninka arboreal chinchilla rat
C. oblativus - Machu Picchu arboreal chinchilla rat

References
Citations

Bibliography
Braun, J. K.  and M. A. Mares. 2002. Systematics of the Abrocoma cinerea species complex (Rodentia: Abrocomidae), with a description of a new species of Abrocoma. Journal of Mammalogy, 83:1-19.
Emmons, L. H. 1999. A new genus and species of abrocomid rodent from Peru (Rodentia: Abrocomidae).  American Museum Novitas, 3279:1-14.

External links
 Animal Diversity web site's chinchilla rat information
 ITIS entry for Abrocomidae

 
Extant Miocene first appearances